Crime Rigg and Sherburn Hill Quarries  is a Site of Special Scientific Interest in County Durham, England. It lies about 1 km east of the village of Sherburn Hill and about 7 km east of the city of Durham.

The site is a working quarry in which is exposed a sequence of Lower Permian Yellow Sands overlying Marl Slate and Lower Magnesian Limestone. The exposures of Permian sands exhibit complex cross-bedding that is believed to represent ancient seif dune deposits.

References

Sites of Special Scientific Interest in County Durham
Quarries in County Durham